Harry Romm (1896–1986) was an American producer and agent. He was a long time agent for The Three Stooges.

Romm turned to producing movies in the late 1940s. He returned to it in the late 1950s.

Select credits
Swing Parade of 1946 (1946)
Ladies of the Chorus (1948)
Senior Prom (1958)
Have Rocket, Will Travel (1959)
Hey, Let's Twist! (1961)
Stop! Look! and Laugh! (1961)
Two Tickets to Paris (1961)

References

External links

American film producers
1896 births
1986 deaths